Washington Township is one of eleven townships in Ripley County, Indiana. As of the 2010 census, its population was 2,440 and it contained 934 housing units.

Geography

Cities and towns
 Milan (southern half)

Unincorporated towns
 Elrod
 Stringtown

Education
Washington Township residents may obtain a free library card from the Osgood Public Library Central Library in Osgood, or its branch in Milan.

References

External links
 Indiana Township Association
 United Township Association of Indiana

Townships in Ripley County, Indiana
Townships in Indiana